Litoria spaldingi, the northern creek frog, is a frog endemic to Australia.  It has been found in the Northern Territory and in the western Queensland.

Original publication

References

spaldingi
Frogs of Australia
Amphibians of Queensland
Amphibians of the Northern Territory
Taxa named by William Hosmer (herpetologist)
Amphibians described in 1964